Conrad Henry Moehlman (May 26, 1879 – September 19, 1961) was an American professor of church history at Colgate Rochester Divinity School, where he was emeritus professor. A Baptist and known as theologically liberal, he was a strong proponent of the separation of church and state and wrote a number of books on religion and education, church history, and Christianity.

Life 
Moehlman was born in Meriden, Connecticut.

He graduated from the University of Michigan in 1902 with a Bachelor of Arts degree. He received a Bachelor of Divinity degree from the Baptist Rochester Theological Seminary in 1905 and two years later, began teaching Hebrew and Old Testament history there. Moehlman received his PhD from the University of Michigan in 1918. After the departure of Walter Rauschenbusch, Moehlman became the professor of church history at Rochester, which later merged with Colgate University. An active member of the American Society of Church History, Moehlman was the organization's president in 1933.

After retiring from Colgate Rochester in 1944, he went on to teach at the University of Rochester, the University of Southern California and Oberlin College. He taught in fields such as Hebrew literature, Biblical languages, New Testament interpretation, and church history.

Theologically liberal, Moehlman was dedicated to the separation of church and state. He wrote a number of books on Christianity, religion and education, and church history.

He was married to Bertha Young Moehlman. His son, Arthur Henry Moehlman (1907–1978) was a professor of history and philosophy at the University of Texas at Austin. A granddaughter through his daughter, Constance F. Citro, is a noted statistician. Moehlman died in Avon Park, Florida in 1961.

Publications (partial list) 
 The combination Theos Soter as Explanation of the Primitive Christian use of Soter as Title and Name of Jesus
 Is the Study of the History of Christianity Practical? (1925)
 A Syllabus Of The History of Christianity (1926)
 The Unknown Bible, a Study of the Problem of Attitude Toward the Bible (1926)
 The Story of the Ten Commandments: a Atudy of the Hebrew Decalogue in its Ancient and Modern Application (1928)
 The Catholic-Protestant Mind: Some Aspects of Religious Liberty in the United States (1929)
 The Christian-Jewish tragedy: A Study in Religious Prejudice (1933)
 Baptist View of the State (1935)
 The American Constitutions and Religion: Religious References in the Charters of the Thirteen Colonies and the Constitutions of the Forty-eight States (1938)
 In Defense of the American Way of Life (1939)
 Protestantism's Challenge: An Historical Study of the Survival Value of Protestantism (1939)
 School and Church: the American Way — An Historical Approach to the Problem of Religious Instruction in Public Education (1944)
 The Church as Educator (1947)
 Sayings of Jesus (1950)
 The Wall of Separation Between Church and State: An Historical Study of Recent Criticism of the Religious Clause of the First Amendment (Beacon Studies in Freedom and Power) (1951)
 Ordeal by Concordance: An Historical Study of a Recent Literary Invention (1955)
 How Jesus became God: An Historical Study of the Life of Jesus to the Age of Constantine (1960)

References 

American historians of religion
Baptists from Connecticut
Seminary academics
University of Michigan alumni
People from Meriden, Connecticut
1879 births
1961 deaths
Colgate Rochester Crozer Divinity School alumni
Historians of Christianity
20th-century American historians
American male non-fiction writers
Colgate University faculty
Historians from Connecticut
Presidents of the American Society of Church History
Historians from New York (state)
20th-century American male writers